The Verzetskruis 1940–1945 (English: Cross of Resistance 1940–1945) is a decoration for valour in the Netherlands. Instituted on May 3, 1946, it was awarded in recognition of the individual courage shown in resistance against the enemies of the Netherlands and for the maintenance of liberties. It is one of the highest decorations in the Netherlands.

Before the Netherlands was liberated in May 1945, the Dutch government in London had developed a valid and balanced system of decorations, both civil and military. In addition to the existing Military Order of William, they were created new ones as the Bronze Lion, the Bronze Cross, the Cross of Merit and the Cross of the Flyer. But there was no valid award to reward members of resistance organizations, while neighboring countries had already filled this gap. As it was not agreed that the acts of the Resistance could be rewarded with an existing military decoration, it was decided to create a specific one.

During the war, each of the acts of Resistance was considered as good as any other. In addition, other countries had distinguished the Dutch resistance with decorations such as the British King's Medal for Courage in the Cause of Freedom or the American Medal of Freedom. On the other hand, there was Queen Wilhelmine's personal wish that the work of the Resistance was to be rewarded.

The cross was awarded in 2 formats: 60x36 mm (2,3x1,4 in) for survivors and 80x48 mm (3,1x1,8 in) for those who received it posthumously.

It has been granted 95 times, 93 of them to deceased resistance workers (85 Dutch, 7 French, 2 Belgians and 1 to the Monument to the Jews killed during the Holocaust).

Badge

A bronze cross on a flame star, and a royal crown on top. In the center is the image of Saint George (symbolizing the Dutch Resistance) killing the dragon (the Nazis). On the arms of the cross is the inscription "TROUW TOT IN DEN DOOD" (Loyal to death). On the reverse side, a flaming sword breaks a chain in two.

It hangs from a crimson gallon, with an orange line at each edge.

Recipients 

 Paul Guermonprez
 Walraven van Hall
 Bernardus IJzerdraat
 Gerrit Kastein
 Denis Mesritz
 Hannie Schaft
 Richard Schoemaker
 Benjamin Marius Telders
 :nl:Gerard Tieman (the only living recipient)
 Gerrit van der Veen
 Mathilde Verspyck
 Pierre Versteegh
 Gabrielle Weidner

See also
Military William Order
Order of the Netherlands Lion
Order of Orange Nassau
Resistance Memorial Cross, a lower level award.

References

Orders, decorations, and medals of the Netherlands
Awards established in 1946
Dutch resistance
1946 establishments in the Netherlands